Pinehouse is a northern village located in the boreal forest of Saskatchewan on the western shore of Pinehouse Lake within the Canadian Shield.

Travelling by road from Pinehouse, the Key Lake mine is 223 km (138 miles) north, Prince Albert is 346 km (215 miles) south, La Ronge is 214 km (133 miles) east and Beauval, the closest community, is 107 km (67 miles) west. Highway 914 passes through the community and Pinehouse is the only established community along this road, other than uranium mines.

There were 1,074 residents in 2016. Cree was the mother tongue of 630 of the residents in 2011. 
The mayor of this predominantly Métis settlement is Mike Natomagan. The village's traditional Cree name is kinêpiko-sâkahikanihk (ᑭᓀᐱᑯ ᓵᑲᐦᐃᑲᓂᕽ) meaning "at the Snake Lake".

History 
There was a North West Company post and a rival post near the mouth of the Tippo River called Lac des Serpents (Lake of Serpents or Snake Lake) in 1786.

The Hudson's Bay Company had a post at the north end of Pinehouse Lake called the Souris River Post. It was located about 2 km west of the mouth of the Belanger River once known as the Souris River. Most of the residents of this settlement which numbered about 100 people in the 1920s and 1930s eventually moved to Pinehouse. The Souris River Post near Sandfly Lake operated from 1875 to 1939. The Census of 1906 called this settlement then numbering 73 people Souris River on the Churchill.

Missionaries first visited the Dene population of Pinehouse Lake in 1899. A smallpox epidemic killed around half of the population of the area in 1900-1901. Some survivors moved up the Churchill River towards Patuanak and downriver to Stanley Mission further depleting the area population.

The 1906 Canada Census uses the name Serpent Lake on the Churchill to describe the community that then had about 11 people which included the family of Samuel and Veronique Misponass.

A townsite was established in the 1940s and a Roman Catholic church (St. Dominic) was built in 1944 followed by a store and in 1948 a school. In 1954 the community was renamed Pinehouse Lake.
Pinehouse was originally named Snake Lake (kinêpiko-sâkahikan in Cree). 
Although officially named Pinehouse, numerous official sources including the official road map of Saskatchewan issued by the province, identifies the community by the name Pinehouse Lake.

Eighty houses were built between 1967 and 1980 and Pinehouse was connected to the power grid in 1984 replacing a diesel generator set up around 1970. The first road to the community was built from Highway 2 in 1977.

Demographics 

Infrastructure 
Pinehouse is home to a store, a gas station, a Royal Canadian Mounted Police detachment, the northern village's office and a health clinic.  The community is served by Pinehouse Lake Airport.
The community is also home to the Pinehouse Photography Club, a non-profit organization that supports and encourages youth mental health prevention through therapeutic photography. 

The ice skating arena features an artificial ice plant.

Education 
Pinehouse has two schools - Minahik Waskahigan Elementary School and Minahik Waskahigan High School. The schools are in the Northern Lights School Division #113 and have an enrolment of 400 students and a support staff of 40.

See also 

 List of communities in Northern Saskatchewan
 List of communities in Saskatchewan
 Villages of Saskatchewan

References 

Division No. 18, Saskatchewan
Northern villages in Saskatchewan
Métis in Saskatchewan
Lands inhabited by indigenous peoples